Robert Lee Eskridge (November 22, 1891 – April 14, 1975) was an American genre painter, muralist and illustrator.

Biography 
He was born in Philipsburg, Pennsylvania, to Ella May Moore and Joshua Hargus Eskridge.  Eskridge moved with his family to Pasadena, California as a child. He studied at the University of Southern California, the Los Angeles College of Fine Arts, the Art Institute of Chicago, the Chicago Academy of Fine Arts and with George Senseney and André Lhote in Paris. After traveling extensively in Spain and the South Seas, he lived in Chicago, New York, and Coronado Beach, California (1917–32). He moved to Honolulu in 1932 and taught at the University of Hawaii. During the Great Depression he was a Works Progress Administration muralist. His murals are in the Ala Moana Park Sports Pavilion in Honolulu and at Palmer House in Chicago.

The Honolulu Museum of Art and Smithsonian American Art Museum are among the public collections holding works of Eskridge.

Books

As author and illustrator 
 Manga Reva. The Forgotten Islands (1931). Bobbs Merrill. Adult non-fiction.
 South Sea Playmates (1933). Bobbs Merrill. Children's non-fiction.
 Umi: The Hawaiian Boy Who Became a King (1936). John C. Winston Company.

As illustrator 
 No-Wa-Na: An Indian Tale Told in Verse by John Fremont Kyger. (1919). Fremont Publishing, Chicago.
(1920). The Reilly & Lee Co., Chicago.
 The Boy King of the Cannibal Islands by C.A.F. Ducorron. (1932). Bobbs Merrill.
 Pikoi and Other Legends of the Island of Hawaii as retold by Caroline Curtis; Mary Kawena Pukui, editor. (1949). Kamehameha Schools Press.

References
 Congdon-Martin, Douglas, Aloha Spirit, Hawaiian Art and Popular Design, Schiffer Publishing, Atglen, PA, 1998, pp. 174–175
 Forbes, David W., "Encounters with Paradise: Views of Hawaii and its People, 1778-1941", Honolulu Academy of Arts, 1992, 213–257.
 Papanikolas, Theresa and DeSoto Brown, Art Deco Hawai'i, Honolulu, Honolulu Museum of Art, 2014, pp. 67–69
 Sandulli, Justin M., Troubled Paradise: Madge Tennent at a Hawaiian Crossroads, Durham, NC: Duke University, 2016
 Severson, Don R. Finding Paradise: Island Art in Private Collections, University of Hawaii Press, 2002, pp. 124–5.
Hustace, James J.  Painters and Etchers of Hawaii-A Biographical Collection-1780-2018, Library of Congress (C)

Footnotes

American muralists
20th-century American painters
American male painters
American genre painters
Artists from Hawaii
Works Progress Administration workers
1891 births
1975 deaths
Painters from California
People from Philipsburg, Centre County, Pennsylvania
20th-century American male artists